Makarska is a town on the Adriatic coastline of Croatia, about  southeast of Split and  northwest of Dubrovnik, in the Split-Dalmatia County.

Makarska is a prominent regional tourist center, located on a horseshoe-shaped bay between the Biokovo mountains and the Adriatic Sea. The city is noted for its palm-fringed promenade, where cafes, bars and boutiques overlook the harbor. Adjacent to the beach are several large capacity hotels as well as a camping grounds.

Makarska is the center of the Makarska Riviera, a popular tourist destination under the Biokovo mountain.

History

Pre-history
Near present-day Makarska, there was a settlement as early as the middle of the 2nd millennium BC. It is thought that it was a point used by the Cretans on their way up to the Adriatic (the so-called "amber road"). However it was only one of the ports with links with the wider Mediterranean, as shown by a copper tablet with Cretan and Egyptian systems of measurement.

A similar tablet was found in the Egyptian pyramids. In the Illyrian era this region was part of the broader alliance of tribes, led by the Ardaeans, founded in the third century BC in the Cetina area (Omiš) down to the River Vjosë in present-day Albania.

The Roman era
Although the Romans became rulers of the Adriatic by defeating the Ardiaei in 228, it took them two centuries to confirm their rule. The Romans sent their veteran soldiers to settle in Makarska. After the division of the Empire in 395, this part of the Adriatic became part of the Eastern Roman Empire and many people fled to Muccurum from the new wave of invaders. The town appears in the Tabula Peutingeriana as the port of Inaronia, but is mentioned as Muccurum, a larger settlement that grew up in the most inaccessible part of Biokovo mountain, probably at the very edge of the Roman civilisation. It appears as Macrum on the acts of the Salonan Synod of 4 May 533 AD held in Salona (533), when also the town's diocese was created.

Early Middle Ages
During the Migration Period, in 548, Muccurum was destroyed by the army of the Ostrogoth king Totila. The byzantine Emperor expelled the Eastern Goths (Ostrogoths).

In the 7th century the region between the Cetina and Neretva was occupied by the Narentines, with Mokro, located in today's Makarska, as its administrative centre. The doge of Venice Pietro I Candiano, whose Venetian fleet aimed to punish the piratesque activities of the town's vessels, was defeated here on September 18, 877 and had to pay tribute to the Narentines for the free passage of its ships on the Adriatic.

Late Middle Ages
The principality was annexed to the Kingdom of Croatia in the 12th century, and was conquered by the Republic of Venice a century later. Making use of the rivalry between the Croatian leaders and their power struggles (1324–1326), the Bosnian Ban Stjepan II Kotromanić annexed the Makarska coastal area. There were many changes of rulers here: from the Croatian and Bosnian feudal lords, to those from Zahumlje (later Herzegovina).

In the eventful 15th century the Ottomans conquered the Balkans. In order to protect his territory from the Turks, Duke Stjepan Vukčić Kosača handed the region to the Venetians in 1452. The Makarska coastal area fell to the Turks in 1499.

Under the Turks
Under Ottoman rule, the town was surrounded with walls that had three towers. The name Makarska was cited for the first time in a 1502 document telling how nuns from Makarska were permitted to repair their church.
The Turks had links with all parts of the Adriatic via Makarska and they therefore paid a great deal of attention to the port's maintenance. In 1568 they built a fortress as defence against the Venetians. During Turkish rule the seat of the administrative and judicial authority was in Foča, Mostar, for a short time in Makarska itself and finally in Gabela on the River Neretva.

During the Candian War between Venice and the Turks (1645–1669), the desire among the people of the area to be free of the Turks intensified.  In 1646, Venice recaptured the coastline. A period of dual leadership, marked with armed conflicts, destruction, and reprisals, lasted until 1684, until the danger of the Turks ended in 1699.

Once more under the Venetians

In 1695 Makarska became the seat of a bishopric and commercial activity came to life, but it was a neglected area and little attention was given to the education of its inhabitants. At the time when the people were fighting against the Turks, and Venice paid more attention to the people's demands. According to Alberto Fortis in his travel chronicles (18th century), Makarska was the only town in the coastal area, and the only Dalmatian town where there were absolutely no historical remains.

After the fall of the Venetian Republic, it was given to the Austrians by the Treaty of Campo Formio (1797).

From 1797 to 1813
With the fall of Venice, the Austrian army entered Makarska and remained there until Napoleon took the upper hand. The French arrived in Makarska on 8 March 1806 and remained until 1813. This was an age of prosperity, cultural, social and economic development. Under French rule all the people were equal, and education laws written, for the first time in many centuries, in Croatian were passed. Schools were opened. Makarska was at this time a small town with about 1580 inhabitants.

Under the Austrians (1813–1918)
As in Dalmatia as a whole, the Austrian authorities imposed a policy of Italianization, and the official language was Italian. The Makarska representatives in the Dalmatian assembly in Zadar and the Imperial Council in Vienna demanded the introduction of Croatian for use in public life, but the authorities steadfastly opposed the idea. One of the leaders of the National (pro-Croatian) Party was Mihovil Pavlinović of Podgora. Makarska was one of the first communities to introduce Croatian (1865).

In the second half of the 19th century Makarska experienced a great boom and in 1900 it had about 1800 inhabitants. It became a trading point for agricultural products, not only from the coastal area, but also from the hinterland (Bosnia and Herzegovina) and had shipping links with Trieste, Rijeka and Split.

The Congress of Vienna assigned Makarska to Austria-Hungary, under which it remained until 1918.

The 20th century

In the early 20th century agriculture, trade and fishing remained the mainstay of economy. In 1914, the first hotel was built, beginning the tourism tradition in the area. During World War II, Makarska was part of the Independent State of Croatia. It was a port for the nation's navy and served as the headquarters of the Central Adriatic Naval Command, until it was moved to Split.

After the war, during the socialist Yugoslavia, Makarska experienced a period of growth, and the population tripled. All the natural advantages of the region were used to create in Makarska one of the best known tourist areas on the Croatian Adriatic.

The 21st century 
After the Croatian independence Makarska had a sustained growth in first few years with many of the refugees (mostly from Herzegovina) being accommodated in tourist accommodation. In the late 90s tourism was thriving again and in following decades created a speculative, rapid and wild construction boom with lot of highly problematic expansions (especially in Veliko Brdo), while with little or no urban planning at all. Local and regional experts have been active in drawing attention to the problems caused by the lack of planning and in this have recently been joined by members of the local population and citizens along with urban and environmental activists.

Geography 

Makarska is located in central Dalmatia, at the junction of Biokovo and the Adriatic Sea.

The town is sharply separated from the interior by the mountain Biokovo (the highest peak of St. George, 1762 m), and it is connected with the central Dalmatian islands of Brač and Hvar by the Adriatic Sea, which modelled some of the most beautiful Croatian beaches in the Makarska Riviera.

The town itself is located in a natural harbour between two peninsulas, Osejava and Sv. Petra. The flysch zone between the mountain and the sea is only a few kilometres wide, so that the further expansion of the city goes to the east and west, i.e. to the neighbouring settlements of Tučepi and Krvavica.

Main sights 
St. Mark's Cathedral (17th century), in the Main Square.
Statue of the friar Andrija Kačić Miošić by the famous Croatian sculptor Ivan Rendić.
St. Philip's Church (18th century).
St. Peter's church (13th century), situated on the Sv. Petar peninsula, rebuilt in 1993.
The Franciscan monastery (16th century). It houses a library with numerous books and rare incunabulas and a famous, world known collection of shells from all over the world, collected in a Malacological Museum from 1963.
Napoleon monument, erected in the honour of the French Marshal Marmont in 1808.
The Baroque Ivanišević Palace.
Villa Tonolli, which is home to the Town Museum.

Government and politics 
The mayor of Makarska is Zoran Paunović (SDP). He was confirmed as mayor on 30 May 2021 winning 59.85% of the vote (2021 Croatian local elections, second round). The deputy mayor (vice mayor) is Antonia Radić Brkan (Ind.).

The City Council is composed of 15 representatives. The last elections were held on 16 May 2017 (2021 Croatian local elections). The two largest parties in the city assembly are SDP with 7 members and HDZ with 5 members.

Climate and vegetation 
Makarska experiences a hot-summer Mediterranean climate (Köppen climate classification: Csa). Winters are warm and wet, while summers are hot and dry. In summer, daytime temperatures are around 30 °C, often around 35 °C, and nighttime temperatures are around 25 °C. Winter temperatures are mostly from 10 to 15 during the day, and from 6 to 10 °C at night. Makarska is one of the warmest towns in Croatia.

Vegetation is the evergreen Mediterranean type, and subtropical flora (palm-trees, agaves, cacti) grow in the town and its surroundings.

Economy 

The main economic activity of Makarska, as well as the whole region, is tourism. Tourists have at their disposal a large number of beds in the hotel and private accommodation.

Education 
There are 3 primary schools and 3 secondary schools.

Demographics 
According to the 2011 census, the total population of the town is 13,834, in the following settlements:

 Makarska, population: 13,426
 Veliko Brdo, population: 408

A 2019 study found that high school students in Makarska were the tallest in the Dinaric Alps (and the world), with males having an average height of 187.6 cm.

Notable natives/residents 

Giuseppe Addobbati (1909–1986) - Italian film actor
Jure Bilić (1922–2006) - Yugoslav and Croatian politician
Alen Bokšić (1970–) - Croatian retired football player
Stipe Drviš (1973–) - Croatian boxer
Garry Kasparov (1963–) - Soviet and Russian chess grandmaster; naturalised Croatian citizen
Andrija Kačić Miošić (1704–1760) - Croatian poet and monk

Twin towns/cities 
Makarska is twinned with:
  Đakovo, Croatia
  Stari Grad, Croatia
  Vukovar, Croatia
  Kavadarci, North Macedonia
  Budva, Montenegro
  Sarajevo, Bosnia and Herzegovina
  Travnik, Bosnia and Herzegovina
  Maribor, Slovenia
  Znojmo, Czech Republic
  Nocera Inferiore, Italy
Friendly relationships:
  Vinkovci, Croatia
  Roseto degli Abruzzi, Italy
  Stein, Germany
  Neumarkt in der Oberpfalz, Germany
  Bugojno, Bosnia and Herzegovina
  Olomouc, Czech Republic

Gallery

See also 
 Croatia
 Dalmatia

References

Notes

Bibliography

Sources and external links 

 
 GCatholic - former cathedral
 

Cities and towns in Croatia
Populated places in Split-Dalmatia County
Kingdom of Dalmatia
Populated coastal places in Croatia